Two regiments of the British Army have been numbered the 110th Regiment of Foot:

110th Regiment of Foot (Queen's Royal Musqueteers), raised in 1761
110th Regiment of Foot, raised in 1794